Bráulio Edgar Alcântara Morais, born December 17, 1990, in Luanda, is an Angolan professional basketball player. Bráulio, who stands at 190 cm (6' 4"), plays as a point guard.
Bráulio is a brother of Petro Atlético player Carlos Morais.

He currently plays for Angolan side Primeiro de Agosto at the Angolan basketball league BIC Basket.

References

External links
 2009 U-19 FIBA World Cup Stats
 2008 U-18 FIBA Africa Championship Stats
 Interview with Club-K pt

1990 births
Living people
Angolan men's basketball players
Atlético Petróleos de Luanda basketball players
C.R.D. Libolo basketball players
Point guards
African Games bronze medalists for Angola
African Games medalists in basketball
Competitors at the 2011 All-Africa Games